Alagwa (Alaagwa’isa) is a Cushitic language spoken in Tanzania in the Dodoma region. Some Alagwa have shifted to other languages such as Sandawe.

Grammar

Phonology 
Alagwa has five vowels (/a, e, i, u, o/). The five vowels have contrastive long counterparts   and there are two diphthongs (/ay, aw/). Alagwa also has 29 consonants, including ejectives (/ts, q, qʷ/), pharyngeal fricatives( /ħ, ʕ/), and labialized velars and uvulars.  

There are two tone levels in Alagwa: low and high tone e.g., darimbáa "grass". Tone has grammatical function and limited lexical function. However, it cannot be described as a tone language because some words have only one tone (despite the number of the syllables) and the majority have none.

Mainly, there are two intonation types: concluding intonation and non-concluding.

Word order
Alagwa sentences have a generalized order [Subject X Auxiliary Y Verb Z], and elements of the sentence other than the subject appear in the positions labelled X, Y, and Z, depending on their information status in the clause.  New material tends to appear in the post-verbal position, Z, while old information appears in the pre-auxiliary position, X.

The following example (Kiessling 2007:138) shows the noun yaawáa 'dowry' introduced as new information after the verb in the first sentence and repeated as old information before the auxiliary ningi in the second sentence.

References

Bibliography 
 Kiesling, Roland. 2007. Alagwa functional sentence perspective and "incorporation". Omotic and Cushitic Language Studies. Papers from the Fourth Cushitic Omotic Conference, Leiden, 10–12 April 2003. Edited by Azeb Amha, Maarten Mous, Graziano Savà. Rüdiger Köppe Verlag. .
Maghway, Josephat B. 2008. Alaagwa'isa Phonology. In Occasional papers in linguistics (OPiL), Vol. 3, 82-96
Mous, Maarten. 2001. Alagwa basic syntax. In New data and new methods in Afroasiatic linguistics. Zaborski, Andrzej (ed.), 125-135. Wiesbaden: Otto Harrassowitz.

South Cushitic languages
Languages of Tanzania